Mario Alberto Cárdenas Virrey (born 23 August 1993) is a Mexican professional football player who last played for Reboceros de La Piedad.

Career

Cárdenas grew up playing baseball as a child, as was common in his hometown of Guaymas, but he began playing football at the age of 12. He was discovered by Santos Laguna scouts while playing in a national tournament, and immediately joined their youth ranks. In a span of two years, Cárdenas progressed from the under-17 squad to the senior team. He made his professional debut for Santos on 19 August 2012, coming on for Darwin Quintero in a 2–1 league defeat to Pumas UNAM.

Cárdenas was loaned out to Calor de Gómez Palacio in January 2014. After parting ways with Santos Laguna, he joined Pioneros de Cancún for six months.

Cárdenas returned to his home state when he joined Cimarrones de Sonora in 2015. In his first game as a starter, he scored a hat-trick to secure a 3–1 win against Estudiantes Tecos.

He played with Acaxees de Durango of the Liga de Balompié Mexicano during the league's inaugural season in 2020–21.

References

External links
 
 
 

1993 births
Living people
Association football forwards
Santos Laguna footballers
Pioneros de Cancún footballers
Cimarrones de Sonora players
Albinegros de Orizaba footballers
La Piedad footballers
Liga MX players
Liga Premier de México players
Liga de Balompié Mexicano players
Footballers from Sonora
People from Guaymas
Mexican footballers